Pavel Grigorievich Chesnokov (Russian: Пáвел Григóрьевич Чеснокóв) (24 October 1877, Voskresensk, Zvenigorodsky Uyezd, Moscow Governorate – 14 March 1944, Moscow, also transliterated Tschesnokoff, Tchesnokov, Tchesnokoff, and Chesnokoff) was an Imperial Russian and Soviet composer, choral conductor and teacher.  He composed over five hundred choral works, over four hundred of which are sacred. Today, he is most known for his piece Salvation is Created as well as works such as Do Not Reject Me in Old Age (solo for basso profondo) and movements from various settings of the Divine Liturgy of St John Chrysostom.

Life 
Chesnokov was born in Vladimir, near Moscow on 24 October 1877. While attending the Moscow Conservatory, he received extensive training in both instrumental and vocal music including nine years of solfège, and seven years training for both the piano and violin. His studies in composition included four years of harmony, counterpoint, and form. During his years at the school, he had the opportunity to study with prominent Russian composers like Sergei Taneyev and Mikhail Ippolitov-Ivanov, who greatly influence his style of liturgy-driven choral composition.

At an early age, Chesnokov gained recognition as a great conductor and choirmaster while leading many groups including the Russian Choral Society Choir. This reputation earned him a position on staff at the Moscow Conservatory where great composers and music scholars like Tchaikovsky had shared their skills and musical insight. There he founded a choral conducting program, which he taught from 1920 until his death.

By the age of 30, Chesnokov had completed nearly four hundred sacred choral works, but his proliferation of church music came to a standstill at the time of the Russian revolution.  Under communist rule, no one was permitted to produce any form of sacred art. So in response, he composed an additional hundred secular works, and conducted secular choirs like the Moscow Academy Choir and the Bolshoi Theatre Choir. In the Soviet era religion was often under oppression. The Cathedral of Christ the Saviour, whose last choirmaster had been Chesnokov, was destroyed, which disturbed him so deeply that he stopped writing music altogether.

He died on 14 March 1944 of a heart attack caused by malnutrition while he was waiting in a Moscow bread line.

Notes

Some notable works
Corpus
Salvation is Created (1912)
O Lord God
Now We Sing the Praise
Duh Tvoy Blagiy ("Let Thy Good Spirit")
Liturgy of the Presanctified Gifts, Op.24
Panikhída, Op.39
Divine Liturgy of St. John Chrysostom, Op.42
All-night vigil, Op.44

References
 Bakst, James. A History of Russian-Soviet Music. New York: Dodd, Mead and Company, 1966.
 deAlbuquerque, Joan. Salvation Is Created, Pavel Tschesnokoff (1877-1944). Vol. IV, in Teaching Music through Performance in Band, by Larry Blocher, Eugene M Corporon, Ray Cramer, Tim Lautzenheiser, Edward S. Lisk and Richard Miles, 370-374. Chicago, IL: GIA Publications, Inc., 1997-2002.
 Leonard, Richard Anthony. A History of Russian Music. New York: The Macmillan Company, 1956.
 Moscow Hotels, JSC. The Cathedral of Christ the Savior. 2001-2007. http://www.moscow-taxi.com/churches/cathedral-of-christ-savior.html (accessed April 8, 2008).
 Thompson, Oscar. The International Cyclopedia of Music and Musicians. Tenth Edition. Edited by Bruce Bohle. New York: Dodd, Mead, 1975.

External links

1877 births
1944 deaths
People from Istrinsky District
People from Zvenigorodsky Uyezd (Moscow Governorate)
Russian classical composers
Russian male classical composers
Soviet composers
Soviet male composers
Composers from the Russian Empire
Classical composers of church music
Conductors (music) from the Russian Empire
Soviet conductors (music)
19th-century classical composers
20th-century classical composers
20th-century Russian conductors (music)
Russian male conductors (music)
20th-century Russian male musicians
19th-century male musicians
19th-century musicians